Santana do Livramento is a city in the state of Rio Grande do Sul, Brazil. It is located along the border with the city of Rivera, Uruguay, forming together an international city of almost 170,000 inhabitants. Santana do Livramento was founded on July 30, 1823, and in 1857 was emancipated from Alegrete as a city. In 2009, the city was officially declared by the Brazilian government as the symbolic city of Brazilian integration with the Mercosur member states.

History 

The first known occupants of the region of the current municipality were the Charrúa and minuane indigenous. Then came Spanish Jesuits, then throughout the 19th century came Portuguese and Italian immigrants. In 1810, the political instability that would lead to the independence of the Spanish colonies in the Platina Basin led to the arrival of Portuguese troops to the region, in order take advantage of the opportunity and extend their empire in areas of temperate weather so coveted by them. These troops, commanded by Diogo de Sousa, Count of Rio Pardo, founded the present city of Santana do Livramento, through the construction of a chapel dedicated to the homonymous saint. The permanent Portuguese settlement of the region began with the donation of sesmarias made by the Marquês of Alegrete in 1814. Founded the city on July 30, 1823, it was elevated to the category of municipality in 1857, emancipating itself from Alegrete.

The city went through periods of great prosperity, when large woolen mills, refrigerators, social organizations and soccer clubs were emerging. Slowly, the economy has been fading, for many reasons, among which can be cited: isolation (distance from other expressive economic centers), centralist vision (in politics, industry, commerce, territorial organization), economic option agriculture and trade, without emphasis on the development of industry, which plays the role of "bridge" between the aforementioned activities.

In 1912, the city started the first train station in Brazil with international traffic, between Santana do Livramento and Rivera, Uruguay, with trains connecting Rio de Janeiro and São Paulo to Montevideo and Buenos Aires. Currently, the international train route is disabled.

The area of the municipality located between the Quaraí River and the Arroio Invernada (called the Rincão de Artigas) has been claimed by the government of Uruguay since 1934.

Geography 
Livramento shares more than Uruguay. Santana do Livramento is located on the Brazilian border with Uruguay, where they share around 100 km of border. On the other side of the land divide (an urban street), is the Uruguayan city of Rivera. It is one of the oldest municipalities, and the second largest in the territorial extension of the state of Rio Grande do Sul. The border community is unusual in that the two cities maintain an open border without any physical border barriers. Inhabitants from both Livramento (Brazil) and Rivera (Uruguay) are free to move anywhere throughout the twin city community. It is easy for one to get lost in the suburbs and not know whether they are in Brazil or Uruguay.

Travellers crossing the border here and proceeding further into the other country are required to complete border formalities at an integrated border control post located at Siñeriz Shopping in Rivera. The integrated border control post housing the immigration and customs offices of both countries was inaugurated on 28 December 2016. Previously, travellers had to visit various offices located in different parts of the twin cities.

Ibirapuitã Park, on BR 293, lies about ten kilometers from the city.

Climate 
The climate in Santana do Livramento is humid subtropical (Cfa, according to the Köppen climate classification). The temperature is mild in winter and hot in summer.

Demographics 

Religion 

The majority of the population declares themselves Roman Catholic. However, in the last few years there has been a great increase in the number of Protestants in the Pentecostal and traditional aspects, especially in: Assembleia de Deus Church, Metodista Wesleyana Church, Evangelho Quadrangular Church, Deus é Amor, Batista Nacional Church, Internacional da Graça de Deus Church, Congregação Cristã no Brasil, among others.

Other lines, also present that are part of Brazilian religiosity: Umbanda and Spiritism by Allan Kardec. Within the plurality of Brazil, Santana do Livramento also have small groups of other creeds as Muslims, originating from countries of the Middle East and Hindus, coming from India.

Economy 
The economy of the city is mainly based on farming, cattle, leather goods and viticulture. The city crosses the 31st parallel, making it an ideal area for wine production. The two main wineries are Almaden and Santa Colina. Tourism also plays a role in city's economy, as many tourists come to Livramento to visit the duty-free shops in its neighboring city Rivera.

Rural tourism is also an attractive option in Santana do Livramento. The city hosts an international kite fair and a festival of lamb and wine. On 20 September the gaúchos commemorate the Ragamuffin War.

Education
Santana do Livramento has seven higher education institutions, three of which are private: University of the Campanha Region, Paulista/Cultural University and Castelo Branco/Exattus University (the last two, distance learning).

The public ones are: State University of Rio Grande do Sul, Federal University of Santa Maria, Open University of Brazil and Federal University of Pampa.

Notable people 
 

Luiz Nunes (born 1980), footballer

Transport 
There is a break of gauge station where the railways of Brazil and Uruguay meet.

Santana do Livramento has an airport but scheduled flights to the Brazilian city usually use Pres. Gral. Óscar D. Gestido International Airport in neighboring Rivera, Uruguay.

References

External links 

 Santana do Livramento detailed city Street Map
 Santana do Livramento city hall

 
Municipalities in Rio Grande do Sul
Divided cities
Brazil–Uruguay border crossings